Phosphoryl fluoride (commonly called phosphorus oxyfluoride) is a compound with the chemical formula . It is a colorless gas that hydrolyzes rapidly.

Synthesis and reactions
Phosphorus oxyfluoride is prepared by partial hydrolysis of phosphorus pentafluoride.

Phosphorus oxyfluoride is the progenitor of the simple fluorophosphoric acids by hydrolysis. The sequence starts with difluorophosphoric acid:

The next steps give monofluorophosphoric acid and phosphoric acid:

Phosphoryl fluoride combines with dimethylamine to produce dimethylaminophosphoryl difluoride  and difluorophosphate and hexafluorophosphate ions.

References

Oxyfluorides
Phosphorus oxohalides
Phosphorus(V) compounds